The 1961–62 Turkish National League was the fourth season of professional football in Turkey. The league consisted of 20 clubs, with Galatasaray winning their first title.

Overview
Galatasaray won their first league title after previously finishing second place two times and third in 1959–60. The club qualified for the European Cup, while runners-up Fenerbahçe qualified for the Balkans Cup. Beşiktaş rounded out the top-three, while Altay were the other European representative, earning qualification to the Inter-Cities Fairs Cup. Fikri Elma of finished top scorer of the league, scoring 22 of Ankara Demirspor's 42 goals as they finished last in the league.

Hacettepe and Beyoğluspor were promoted to the 1962–63 Milli Lig, while no clubs were relegated. Before the start of the season, it was decided only one club would be promoted from the Baraj Games in order to cut down the number of competing clubs from 20 to 18. However, after the Baraj Games, cities boycotted for their clubs to remain in the Milli Lig, and Prime Minister İsmet İnönü asked the Turkish Football Federation to allow these clubs to compete. The TFF allowed for five clubs – three already participating and two promoted from the regional leagues – to compete in the 1962–63 season. The TFF decided to create a second division the following season.

Final league table

Results

Baraj Games

References

Turkish National League
1961–62 in Turkish football
Turkey